Foster William Alfred Hewitt (December 6, 1928 – December 25, 1996) was a Canadian radio and television sportscaster. He was the son of hockey broadcaster Foster Hewitt and the grandson of Toronto Star journalist W. A. Hewitt.

Playing career
Bill Hewitt played competitive football and hockey and competed in track & field while attending Upper Canada College in Toronto, Ontario.

Sports broadcasting
After graduation, Bill Hewitt took a broadcasting job at CJRL in Kenora, Ontario.  He was then hired as sports director of CFOS in Owen Sound, Ontario, and later held the same title at CKBB in Barrie.

In 1951, his father launched CKFH in Toronto at which the younger Hewitt became its sports director at age 23. In the mid-1950s, Hewitt began substituting on Toronto Maple Leafs hockey broadcasts when his father was given other assignments by the CBC, such as covering the Ice Hockey World Championships or Winter Olympics.

By 1958, the two Hewitts were working together in the television booth on Maple Leafs games. Foster eventually returned to radio and for the next two decades, Bill Hewitt was the TV voice of the Toronto Maple Leafs.

In 1981, a blood infection forced Hewitt out of the broadcast booth at the relatively young age of 53.

The Hockey Hall of Fame awarded Hewitt the 2007 Foster Hewitt Memorial Award.

Death
Hewitt died as the result of massive heart failure on Christmas Day morning of December 25, 1996, just before dawn and was later interred in Stone Church Cemetery, east of Beaverton, Ontario.

See also
Notable families in the NHL

References

External links
Foster's Shadow: The On-Air Meltdown of Bill Hewitt @ WFMU
CBC Sports biography 

1928 births
1996 deaths
Canadian radio sportscasters
Canadian television sportscasters
Foster Hewitt Memorial Award winners
Hewitt family
National Hockey League broadcasters
Olympic Games broadcasters
Sportspeople from Ontario
Toronto Maple Leafs announcers
Upper Canada College alumni